Loarn mac Eirc was a possible king of Dál Riata who may have lived in the 5th century. He was buried on Iona. Loarn's main significance is as the eponymous ancestor of Cenél Loairn, a kindred whose name is preserved in Lorne.

The Duan Albanach and the Senchus Fer n-Alban and other genealogies name Loarn's father as Erc son of Eochaid Muinremuir. Loarn appears in Irish traditions as 'King of Alba' in the eighth- to twelfth-century tale "Of The Miracles of Cairnech Here" in the Lebhor Bretnach, the Irish version of the Historia Brittonum, and in the tenth- to twelfth-century tale Aided Muirchertach mac Erca. In these tales, mac Erca spends time with Loarn, his grandfather, before murdering him by setting him aflame.

Notes

References

 Bannerman, John, Studies in the History of Dalriada. Scottish Academic Press, Edinburgh, 1974. 
 Pestano,Dane, King Arthur in Irish Pseudo-Historical Tradition - An Introduction. Dark Age Arthurian Books, 2011.  
 Broun, Dauvit, The Irish Identity of the Kingdom of the Scots in the Twelfth and Thirteenth Centuries. Boydell, Woodbridge, 1999. 
 Menzies, Gordon (ed) (1971) Who are the Scots: A search for the origins of the Scottish nation. BBC. 
 Woolf, Alex, From Pictland to Alba, 789-1070 Edinburgh University Press, 2007.

Kings of Dál Riata
5th-century Irish monarchs
5th-century Scottish monarchs